= All India General Kamgar Union =

Trade union in India

The All India General Kamgar Union (AIGKU), is an Indian trade union that organizes unorganized workers, including small-, medium-, and micro-scale industries. Its central office is in Delhi. It has several units, including telecommunication, health, and universities.
